Aquatopia is an attraction at Tokyo DisneySea theme park at the Tokyo Disney Resort in Chiba, Japan. Located in the Port Discovery area of the park, it is the second attraction to use a trackless ride system designed by Walt Disney Imagineering (the first being Pooh's Hunny Hunt at neighboring park Tokyo Disneyland). The trackless ride system uses computers to guide the vehicles throughout the ride.

It is considered to be the successor to both Disneyland's Motor Boat Cruise and the Autopia, from which Aquatopia received its name as homage. The ride consists of around three dozen vehicles designed to look like personal hovercraft which move independently from each other at quick speeds through a large water lagoon. The water in the lagoon is about 5 cm (2 inches) deep, as the vehicles actually roll along the shallow floor on wheels. The water is kept moving to create the illusion of depth, and occasional funnel drains give the appearance of foreboding whirlpools. Like the older attractions it is inspired by, Aquatopia is self-guided. Due to the ride technology, there are no visible tracks, giving the sensation of spontaneity and surprise to the attraction. There are two sides to the lagoon, which you board from a central boarding platform. During the summer, one side becomes a "wet course" while the other is the "dry course". The "wet course" adds the possibility of getting soaked by hidden water jets along the ride while the "dry course" is jet-free.

References

External links 
 

Amusement rides introduced in 2001
Port Discovery (Tokyo DisneySea)
Tokyo DisneySea
Walt Disney Parks and Resorts attractions
2001 establishments in Japan